Pseudosesia is a genus of moths in the family Sesiidae.

Species
Pseudosesia albifrons (Hampson, 1919)
Pseudosesia caeruleimicans (Hampson, [1893])
Pseudosesia canarensis (Hampson, 1919)
Pseudosesia charlesi (Le Cerf, 1916b)
Pseudosesia croconeura (Meyrick, 1926)
Pseudosesia flavifrons (Hampson, 1919)
Pseudosesia grotei  Moore, 1879
Pseudosesia insularis  Felder, 1861
Pseudosesia limpida (Le Cerf, 1916)
Pseudosesia opalescens (Hampson, 1919)
Pseudosesia pentazonata (Hampson, 1919)
Pseudosesia productalis (Walker, [1865])
Pseudosesia rangoonensis (Swinhoe, 1890)
Pseudosesia isozona (Meyrick, 1887)
Pseudosesia oberthueri (Le Cerf, 1916)
Pseudosesia zoniota (Turner, 1922:62)

References

Sesiidae